The Fédération de Football des Comores (FFC) is the governing body of football in the Comoros. It was founded in 1979, affiliated to FIFA in 2005 and to CAF in 2003.  It organizes the national football league and the national team. 
The first official international played by Comoros was played on the 17 November 2007 against Madagascar for the qualification of 2010 FIFA World Cup and the African Cup of Nations 2010. Comores  recorded its first ever win in international football by beating Botswana 1-0 in 2016.

President 

 Kanizat Ibrahim (Normalization President) (November 2019 – February 2021)
 Said Ali Said Athouman (February 2021 –present)

References

External links
 Fédération de Football des Comores
 Comoros at the FIFA website.
  Comoros  at CAF Online

Comoros
Football in the Comoros
Sports organizations established in 1979
Football